Constantine of Scotland  may refer to:

 Constantine I of Scotland (died 877), king of Scotland
 Constantine II of Scotland (died 952), king of Scotland
 Constantine III of Scotland (died 997), king of Scotland